Andrew M. Brass is a Professor of Bioinformatics at the University of Manchester in the Department of Computer Science and Faculty of Life Sciences.

Education
Brass was educated at the University of Edinburgh, receiving his PhD on Solid-state physics in 1987.

Research
Following his PhD, Brass worked at McMaster University in Canada on a NATO fellowship to study aspects of high-temperature superconductivity and strongly coupled electron systems. In 1990 he moved to the University of Manchester to become a founding member of the bioinformatics group, where he has a wide range of projects in protein function prediction, gene expression analysis, intelligent integration, automated curation, and bioinformatics education.

References

British bioinformaticians
Academics of the University of Manchester
People associated with the Department of Computer Science, University of Manchester
Living people
Year of birth missing (living people)